Courts of Maine include:
;State courts of Maine
Maine Supreme Judicial Court
Maine Superior Court
Maine District Courts (13 districts) 
Maine Problem-Solving Courts

Federal courts located in Maine
United States District Court for the District of Maine

References

External links
 National Center for State Courts – directory of state court websites.
 Courts in Maine at Judgepedia

Courts in the United States